Brezina can refer to:

Places 
 Brezina (village), a village in Trebišov district, Slovakia
 Brézina, a municipality or commune in El Bayadh province, Algeria

People 
 Aristides Brezina (1848-1909), an Austrian mineralogist and meteoriticist
 Greg Brezina (born 1946), a former professional American football player
 Jiri Brezina (born 1933), German scientist
 Thomas Brezina (born 1963), an Austrian author

See also 
 Březina (disambiguation)
 Berezina (disambiguation)

eo:Brezina